The Kalahari Desert is a large semi-arid sandy savanna in Southern Africa extending for , covering much of Botswana, and parts of Namibia and South Africa.

It is not to be confused with the Angolan, Namibian, and South African Namib coastal desert, whose name is of Khoekhoegowab origin and means "vast place".

Etymology
Kalahari is derived from the Tswana word Kgala, meaning "the great thirst", or Kgalagadi, meaning "a waterless place"; the Kalahari has vast areas covered by red sand without any permanent surface water.

History 

The Kalahari Desert was not always a dry desert. The fossil flora and fauna from Gcwihaba Cave in Botswana indicates that the region was much wetter and cooler at least from 30 to 11 thousand BP (before present) especially after 17,500 BP.

Geography 

Drainage of the desert is by dry black valleys, seasonally inundated pans and the large salt pans of the Makgadikgadi Pan in Botswana and Etosha Pan in Namibia. The only permanent river, the Okavango, flows into a delta in the northwest, forming marshes that are rich in wildlife. Ancient dry riverbeds—called omuramba—traverse the central northern reaches of the Kalahari and provide standing pools of water during the rainy season.

A semi-desert, with huge tracts of excellent grazing after good rains, the Kalahari supports more animals and plants than a true desert, such as the Namib Desert to the west. There are small amounts of rainfall and the summer temperature is very high. The surrounding Kalahari Basin covers over  extending farther into Botswana, Namibia and South Africa, and encroaching into parts of Angola, Zambia and Zimbabwe.

Numerous pans exist within the Kalahari, including the Groot-vloer Pan and Verneukpan where evidence of a wetter climate exists in the form of former contouring for capturing of water. This and other pans, as well as river bottoms, were written about extensively at Sciforums by an article by Walter Wagner regarding the extensive formerly wet areas of the Kalahari. The Kalahari is extensive and extends farther north where abandoned extensive roadways also exist.

Climate

North and east, approximately where the dry forests, savannahs and salt lakes prevail, the climate is sub-humid rather than semi-arid. South and west, where the vegetation is predominantly xeric savanna or even a semi-desert, the climate is "Kalaharian" semi-arid. The Kalaharian climate is subtropical (average annual temperature greater than or equal to 18 °C, at peaks reaching 40 °C and above, with mean monthly temperature of the coldest month strictly below 18 °C), and is semi-arid with the dry season during the "cold" season, the coldest six months of the year. It is the southern tropical equivalent of the Sahelian climate with the wet season during summer. The altitude has been adduced as the explanation why the Kalaharian climate is not tropical; its altitude ranges from 600 to 1600 meters (and generally from 800 to 1200 meters), resulting in a cooler climate than that of the Sahel or Sahara. For example, winter frost is common from June to August, something rarely seen in the warmer Sahelian regions. For the same reason, summer temperatures certainly can be very hot, but not in comparison to regions of low altitude in the Sahel or Sahara, where some stations record average temperatures of the warmest month around 38 °C, whereas the average temperature of the warmest month in any region in the Kalahari never exceeds 29 °C, though daily temperatures occasionally reach up to close to  (44.8 °C at Twee Rivieren Rest Camp in 2012).

The dry season lasts eight months or more, and the wet season typically from less than one month to four months, depending on location. The southwestern Kalahari is the driest area, in particular a small region located towards the west-southwest of Tsaraxaibis (Southeast of Namibia). The average annual rainfall ranging from around 110 mm (close to aridity) to more than 500 mm in some areas of the north and east. During summer time in all regions rainfall may go with heavy thunderstorms. In the driest and sunniest parts of the Kalahari, over 4,000 hours of sunshine are recorded annually on average.

In the Kalahari, there are two main mechanisms of atmospheric circulation, dominated by the Kalahari High anticyclone:

 The North and North-west of the Kalahari is subject to the alternation "Intertropical Convergence Zone (ITCZ)/"Continental Trade winds". The ITCZ is the meeting area of the boreal trade winds with their austral counterparts what meteorologists call "Meteorological equator" and the sailors "Doldrum" or "Pot-au-noir" : the ITCZ generates rains in the wet season, whereas the continental trade winds cause the dry season;
 The rest of the Kalahari is subject to the maritime trade winds, that largely shed their moisture as they cross up and over the Southern African Great Escarpment before arriving over the Kalahari.

There are huge subterranean water reserves beneath parts of the Kalahari; the Dragon's Breath Cave, for example, is the largest documented non-subglacial underground lake. Such reserves may be in part the residues of ancient lakes; the Kalahari Desert was once a much wetter place. The ancient Lake Makgadikgadi dominated the area, covering the Makgadikgadi Pan and surrounding areas, but it drained or dried out some 10,000 years ago. In ancient times, there was sufficient moisture for farming, with dikes and dams collecting the water. These are now filled with sediment, breached, or no longer in use, though they can be readily seen via Google Earth.

The Kalahari has had a complex climatic history over the past million or so years, in line with major global changes. Changes in the last 250,000 years have been reconstructed from various data sources, and provide evidence of both former extensive lakes and periods drier than now. During the latter the area of the Kalahari has expanded to include parts of western Zimbabwe, Zambia and Angola.

Vegetation and flora

Due to its low aridity, the Kalahari supports a variety of flora. The native flora includes acacia trees and many other herbs and grasses. The kiwano fruit, also known as the horned melon, melano, African horned cucumber, jelly melon, or hedged gourd, is endemic to a region in the Kalahari Desert (specific region unknown).

Even where the Kalahari "desert" is dry enough to qualify as a desert in the sense of having low precipitation, it is not strictly speaking a desert because it has too dense a ground cover. The main region that lacks ground cover is in the southwest Kalahari (southeast of Namibia, northwest of South Africa and southwest of Botswana) in the south of the Kgalagadi Transfrontier Park. For instance in the ZF Mgcawu District Municipality of South Africa, total vegetation cover may be as low as 30.72% on non-protected (from cattle grazing) farmlands south of Twee Rivieren Rest Camp and 37.74% in the protected (from cattle grazing) South African side of the Kgalagadi Transfrontier Park: these southernmost Kalahari xeric savanna areas are truly semi-deserts. However, in all the remaining Kalahari, except on salt pans during the dry season, the vegetation cover can be clearly denser, up to almost 100% in some limited areas.

In an area of about 600,000 km2 in the south and west of the Kalahari, the vegetation is mainly xeric savanna. This area is the ecoregion identified by World Wide Fund for Nature as Kalahari xeric savanna AT1309. Typical savanna grasses include Schmidtia, Stipagrostis, Aristida, and Eragrostis; these are interspersed with trees such as camelthorn (Acacia erioloba), grey camelthorn (Acacia haematoxylon), shepherd's tree (Boscia albitrunca), blackthorn (Acacia mellifera), and silver cluster-leaf (Terminalia sericea).

In certain areas where the climate is drier, it becomes a true semi-desert with ground not entirely covered by vegetation: "open" as opposed to "closed" vegetation. Examples include the north of the ZF Mgcawu District Municipality, itself in the north of South Africa, and the Keetmanshoop Rural in the southeast of Namibia. In the north and east, there are dry forests covering an area of over 300,000 km2 in which Rhodesian teak and several species of acacia are prominent. These regions are termed Kalahari Acacia-Baikiaea woodlands AT0709.

Outside the Kalahari "desert", but in the Kalahari basin, a halophytic vegetation to the north is adapted to pans, lakes that are completely dry during the dry season, and maybe for years during droughts, such as in Etosha (Etosha Pan halophytics AT0902) and Makgadikgadi (Zambezian halophytics AT0908).

A totally different vegetation is adapted to the perennial fresh water of the Okavango Delta, an ecoregion termed Zambezian flooded grasslands AT0907.

Fauna
The Kalahari is home to many migratory birds and animals. Previously havens for wild animals from elephants to giraffes, and for predators such as lions and cheetahs, the riverbeds are now mostly grazing spots, though leopards and cheetahs can still be found. The area is now heavily grazed and cattle fences restrict the movement of wildlife. Among deserts of the Southern Hemisphere, the Kalahari most closely resembles some Australian deserts in its latitude and its mode of formation.

Although there are few endemic species, a wide variety of species are found in the region, including large predators such as the lion (Panthera leo), cheetah (Acinonyx jubatus), leopard (Panthera pardus), spotted hyena (Crocuta crocuta), brown hyena (Parahyaena brunnea), and African wild dog (Lycaon pictus pictus). Birds of prey include the secretary bird (Sagittarius serpentarius), martial eagle (Polemaetus bellicosus) and other eagles, the giant eagle owl (Bubo lacteus) and other owls, falcons, goshawks, kestrels, and kites. Other animals include wildebeest, springbok, gemsbok and other antelopes, porcupines (Hystrix africaeaustralis) and ostriches (Struthio camelus).

Some of the areas within the Kalahari are seasonal wetlands, such as the Makgadikgadi Pans of Botswana. This area, for example, supports numerous halophilic species, and in the rainy season, tens of thousands of flamingos visit these pans.

The biggest threat to wildlife are the fences erected to manage herds of grazing cattle, a practice which also removes the plant cover of the savanna itself. Cattle ranchers will also poison or hunt down predators from the rangeland, particularly targeting jackals and wild dogs.

Protected areas
The following protected areas were established in the Kalahari:
Central Kalahari Game Reserve
Kgalagadi Transfrontier Park
Khutse Game Reserve
Tswalu Kalahari

Population

The San people have lived in the Kalahari for 20,000 years as hunter-gatherers. They hunt wild game with bows and poison arrows and gather edible plants, such as berries, melons and nuts, as well as insects. The San get most of their water requirements from plant roots and desert melons found on or under the desert floor. They often store water in the blown-out shells of ostrich eggs. The San live in huts built from local materials—the frame is made of branches, and the roof is thatched with long grass. Most of their hunting and gathering techniques replicate pre-historic tribes. Bantu-speaking Tswana, Kgalagadi, and Herero and a small number of European settlers also live in the Kalahari desert. The city of Windhoek is situated in the Kalahari Basin.

Kalahari, San and diamonds

In 1996, De Beers evaluated the potential of diamond mining at Gope. In 1997, the eviction of the San and Bakgalagadi tribes in the Central Kalahari Game Reserve from their land began.
In 2006, a Botswana High Court ruled in favor of the San and Bakgalagadi tribes in the reserve, finding that their eviction was unlawful. The Government of Botswana granted a permit to De Beers' Gem Diamonds/Gope Exploration Company (Pty) Ltd. to conduct mining activities within the reserve.

Settlements within the Kalahari

Botswana
 Gaborone
 Ghanzi
 Orapa
 Tshabong
 Tshane

Namibia
 Gobabis
 Mariental

South Africa
 Upington
 Noenieput
 Rietfontein

See also
Karoo
Kgalagadi (disambiguation)
Thar desert
Sahara
Hot deserts

References

Further reading

External links
 
 "Cry of the Kalahari"
 Kalahari desert's forgotten influence on carbon levels

 
Botswana–Namibia relations
Deserts of Botswana
Deserts of Namibia
Deserts of South Africa
Ergs of Africa